The Fines and Recoveries Act 1833 (3 & 4 Will. IV c.74) was an Act of the Parliament of the United Kingdom of Great Britain and Ireland. It abolished the two species of property conveyance known as fines of lands (or final concords) and common recoveries.

South Australia
The Act is declared in force in South Australia by The Estates Tail Act 1881

References

External links
Fines and Recoveries Act 1833 on legislation.gov.uk

Acts of the Parliament of the United Kingdom concerning England
1833 in British law
1833 in England